Roy Gregory may refer to:
 Roy Gregory (footballer)
 Roy Gregory (American football)